Lady of the Night  is a 1925 American silent romantic drama film directed by Monta Bell. The film stars Norma Shearer in a dual role.

Plot
Chris Helmer is sentenced to 20 years in prison by Judge Banning, and has to leave his wife and baby girl. By coincidence, the judge has a daughter about the same age.

Eighteen years later, the two now motherless young women graduate, Florence Banning from an exclusive private school, Molly Helmer from reform school. Molly and her two friends become taxi dancers. One day, Molly rejects the advances of a stranger at the dance hall where she works. When her boyfriend, "Chunky" Dunn, tries to defend her, he gets knocked down. She is rescued by Chunky's friend, inventor David Page, and falls in love with him. Page is oblivious to this and only sees her as a good pal. The more perceptive Chunky becomes increasingly jealous.

Page perfects a device that can open any safe. Chunky tells him that he knows a gang of crooks who would pay a lot of money for it, but Molly tells him that crime does not pay. Page shows his invention to the directors of a bank, Judge Banning being one. They are impressed and purchase it. As he is leaving the meeting, David bumps into Florence. She too falls for him. Soon, they are dating, much to the displeasure of Florence's spinster aunt. However, when Florence meets Molly by accident at David's workshop, she can see that Molly also loves David. She tells David that Molly has a greater claim to him and breaks up with him. When she gets into her limousine however, she finds Molly there waiting for her. Molly urges her to marry David, thinking only of his happiness. To fool David into believing she never loved him, Molly accepts Chunky's standing offer of marriage.

Cast

Box office
The film grossed a total (domestic and foreign) of $326,000: $235,000 from the U.S. and Canada and $91,000 elsewhere, resulting in a profit of $96,000.

References

External links

 
 
 
 
 Lady of the Night at Silentera.com

1925 romantic drama films
American romantic drama films
American silent feature films
American black-and-white films
Films directed by Monta Bell
Metro-Goldwyn-Mayer films
1920s American films
Silent romantic drama films
Silent American drama films